Juan Pablo Shuk Aparicio (born 7 November 1965) is a Colombian actor who lives and works in Colombia and Spain. He is married to Ana de la Lastra.

He is of Hungarian descent from his father's side, he mentions his father being born in Hungary, while his mother's family is Colombian.

He graduated in 1984 from Colegio San Carlos in Bogotá, Colombia. He also studied Marine Biology at Jorge Tadeo Lozano University.

Filmography

Film roles

Television roles

References

External links
 

1965 births
Living people
Colombian male film actors
Colombian male television actors
People from Bogotá
Spanish people of Colombian descent
Spanish people of Hungarian descent
Colombian people of Spanish descent
Colombian people of Hungarian descent
Jorge Tadeo Lozano University alumni